The Battle of Mairy started on the evening of 7 September, and ended on the morning of 8 September 1944.  The centre of the battle was around the French village of Mairy-Mainville, although other fighting, some of it significant, took place in and around other French towns in the vicinity, including Avril, Mont Bonvilliers, Landres, and Mercy.  The battle took place in the European Theatre of Operations during World War II, and was fought between the German Panzer Brigade 106 and the US 90th Infantry Division.  The battle was a victory for the United States, and the attack of Panzer Brigade 106 resulted in the near destruction of this armoured formation, effectively removing its power, and severely reducing the capabilities of the four Panzer Brigades, of which 106 was one, for the up-coming Lorraine counter-offensive.

Western European Campaign (1944–1945)
Battles of World War II involving Germany
Battles of World War II involving the United States
September 1944 events
1944 in France